Manta (Anta, Banta) is a Grassfields language of Cameroon.

Áncá of Nigeria may be the same language, but it is unattested.

References

Southwest Grassfields languages
Languages of Cameroon